Tony Giammalva and Steve Meister were the defending champions, but lost in the quarterfinals to Gary Donnelly and Butch Walts.

Donnelly and Walts won the title by defeating Mark Dickson and Mike Leach 7–6, 6–4 in the final.

Seeds

Draw

Draw

References

External links
 Official results archive (ATP)
 Official results archive (ITF)

Seiko Super Tennis Hawaii
Seiko Super Tennis Hawaii
Seiko Super Tennis Hawaii
Seiko Super Tennis Hawaii
Hawaii Open